Sant Tukaram Nagar is a Pune Metro station in Pimpri-Chinchwad, India. The station was opened on 6 March 2022 and was the first to be completed. Currently the Purple Line is operational between PCMC and Phugewadi.

Station Layout

References

Pune Metro stations
Railway stations in India opened in 2022